Cymatura mucorea is a species of beetle in the family Cerambycidae. It was described by Léon Fairmaire in 1887. It is known from Tanzania, Kenya, the Democratic Republic of the Congo, Somalia, and Ethiopia.

References

Xylorhizini
Beetles described in 1887